Onaway may  refer to a location in the United States:

 Onaway, Idaho
 Onaway, Michigan
 Onaway (Jefferson, New Hampshire), a historic cottage in the Waumbek Cottages Historic District in Jefferson, New Hampshire